Ctenucha schausi is a moth of the family Erebidae.

References

schausi
Moths described in 1912